The sixth season of the Bleach anime series is named the . In the English adaptation of the anime released by Viz Media, the title of the season is translated as The Arrancar. The episodes are directed by Noriyuki Abe, and produced by TV Tokyo, Dentsu and Studio Pierrot. The season adapts Tite Kubo's Bleach manga series from the rest of the 21st volume to the 26th volume (chapters 183–229), with the exception of episodes 128–131 (filler). The episodes' plot centers on the burgeoning war between the Soul Reapers and the arrancar led by former Soul Reaper captain Sōsuke Aizen.

The season aired on TV Tokyo from January 10 to June 27, 2007. The English adaptation of the Bleach anime is licensed by Viz Media, and began airing on Cartoon Network's Adult Swim in the United States on April 18 and ended on July 11, 2009. 

Five DVD compilations, each containing four episodes of the season, were released by Aniplex between June 27 and October 24, 2007. Viz Media released the season in five DVD volumes from April 20 to August 24, 2010. It was also collected in two DVD boxes on September 28 and December 21, 2010, with the latter including the first two episodes of season 7. Manga Entertainment published the season in DVD volumes in the United Kingdom with the first released on April 11  and the second is on June 13, 2011. A DVD box followed it on September 26, 2011.

The episodes use four pieces of theme music: two opening themes and two ending themes. The opening themes are Yui's "Rolling Star", used for the first eleven episodes, and the remainder of the episodes feature "Alones" by Aqua Timez.



Episode list

References
General

Specific

2007 Japanese television seasons
Season 06